In the first edition of the tournament, Lubomira Bacheva and Åsa Carlsson won the title by defeating María José Martínez Sánchez and María Emilia Salerni 6–3, 6–7(4–7), 6–1 in the final.

Seeds

Draw

Draw

References

External links
 Official results archive (ITF)
 Official results archive (WTA)

2001 WTA Tour
Morocco Open
2001 in Moroccan tennis